Don Manuel, the Bandit (German:Don Manuel, der Bandit) is a 1929 German silent film directed by Romano Mengon.

Cast
In alphabetical order
 Liane D'Orland 
 Angelo Ferrari 
 Diomira Jacobini 
 Judith Massena 
 Clifford McLaglen 
 Dora Meves 
 Karl Platen 
 Yvonne Reggia 
 Nico Turoff 
 Romero Valvidares

References

External links

1929 films
Films of the Weimar Republic
Films directed by Romano Mengon
German silent feature films
German black-and-white films